Keelaperumpallam is a village panchayat situated on the south bank of the Kaveri River in Mayiladuthurai district, Tamil Nadu.  The village name is a combination of three Tamil words: the first keela denote east side to MelaPerumPallam, the second part perum denotes big, and the last part pallam means pit.  Another story is related to the ValamPuriNathar Shiva. Shiva have a one small V-shaped pit on his head so these two adjacent villages are called with pallam.

Keelaperumpallam Shiva  Temple and Kethu temple
The Naganathar Shiva temple is famous for Navagraha worship of Kethu. It is located on the south bank of Cauvery River near the Bay of Bengal. The almighty Shiva is called Naganatha and goddess, Soundaryanayaki.

Keelaperumpallam  Kethu temple
The above shiva temple is also called Keelaperumpallam Kethu temple. The deity Kethu is located north-east of this shiva temple.  The Kethu story is related to the churning of Parkadal (milky way) for nectar.  Lord Vishnu wanted to distribute the nectar only to devas but asura raghu also received the nectar and swallowed, this incident has been found by sun and moon and reported to Vishu. Vishu beheaded the rahu but he did not die because he swallowed the nectar, then his head is called as Rahu and his body is called as Kethu.

Worship
Here kethu is worshipping shiva  as well as shiva is a supreme god in this temple, so first worship shiva then do the pooja for kethu.

Transportation
Only one small motor road connects DharmaKulam (poompuhar) and Thalachangadu. Few service buses are available on this route, thus many people use autorisha and cars to reach the temple. Dharmakulam is located near poompuhar beach to mayiladuthurai main road. There is no train service  available but you can alight at sirkali or mayilaudthurai railwaystation. You can get more travel and temple information at http://wikiedit.org/India/Keelaperumpallam/228919/  and travel detail at http://distancebetween2.com/chennai/keelaperumpallam

References

Villages in Mayiladuthurai district